Intrepid, Intrepida, Intrepide, Intrepido, or similar, may refer to:

People and organizations 
 Intrepid, the code name of William Stephenson, the Canadian World War II spymaster
 The Intrepid Sea-Air-Space Museum in Manhattan
 Intrepid Travel, Australia based small group adventure company
 Intrepid Games, a satellite company of the computer game developer Lionhead Studios, now disbanded
 Intrepid Kart, an Italian kart racing chassis manufacturer
 Intrepid Camera, a British large format camera manufacturer

Vessels and vehicles 

 , any of several French Navy ships, dating back to 1666
 , any of several Royal Navy ships, dating back to 1747
 L'Intrépide, a French military observation balloon of 1795
 , any of several US Navy and fictional ships, dating back to 1803
 Intrepid (balloon aircraft), an American Civil War military observation balloon
, any of several Italian Navy ships, dating back to 1912

Spanish ship Intrépido (1790), a San Ildefonso class warship, a ship-of-the-line of Spain
Intrépido (D38), an Audaz-class destroyer of the Spanish Navy from 1962 to 1982.
 Intrepid (yacht), US-22, an America's Cup sailboat that competed in 1967 and 1970
 LM Intrepid, Lunar Module of the 1969 Apollo 12 lunar landing mission
 , British Royal Navy mid-19th-century wooden sloops
 , a British Royal Navy mid-18th-century third rate ships of the line
  of the Argentine Navy dating from the 1970s
 ARA Intrépida (P-85), a 
 Intrepid RM-1, a Chevrolet-powered IMSA GTP car, which raced from 1991 to 1993
 Dodge Intrepid, an automobile built by Chrysler from 1993 to 2004
RSS Intrepid (69), a Formidable-class frigate of the Singapore Navy since 2008.
 ARC Intrépido (ST-20), a submarine of the Colombian Navy; see List of active ships of the Colombian Navy

Fictional vehicles
 BWS Intrepid, a fictional Union of Border Worlds ship in Wing Commander IV: The Price of Freedom
 Astronave Intrepido, another name for Space Battleship Yamato (fictional spaceship)
 Intrepid-class starship, a Star Trek ship class, the class of USS Voyager featured on Star Trek: Voyager
 USS Intrepid, a fictional Intrepid-class Star Trek starship featured on Star Trek: Intrepid
 USS Intrepid, a fictional Constitution-class starship from the original Star Trek episode "The Immunity Syndrome" (Star Trek: The Original Series)

Entertainment
 Intrepid (film), a 2000 action film
L'intrepido, 2013 Italian comedy film
 Star Trek: Intrepid, a series of fan films
 Intrepido, weekly Italian comic magazine
 Intrepid, a 1983 arcade video game by Nova Games Ltd.

Other 
 Intrepid Ibex, the codename for the 8.10 (October 2008) release of the Ubuntu Linux operating system
 IBM Intrepid, a supercomputer at Argonne National Laboratory

See also